Lautropia is a genus of  bacteria of the family Burkholderiaceae in the class Betaproteobacteria.
Only one species, Lautropia mirabilis, has been described.

References

Burkholderiaceae
Monotypic bacteria genera
Bacteria genera